Comin' Back Home is the fourth studio album by rapper Choppa. It was released on July 18, 2006 and was his second album released through Body Head Entertainment, with production by Roy Jones Jr., Tommy Fingerz, and Scott Ross.

Track listing

References 
 Body Head Entertainment Official website
 Old official website

2006 albums
Choppa albums